"Believer" is a song by American rock band Imagine Dragons. The song was released on February 1, 2017, through Interscope Records and Kidinakorner as the lead single from the band's third studio album, Evolve (2017). It was written by Dan Reynolds, Wayne Sermon, Ben McKee, Daniel Platzman, Justin Tranter and its producers Mattman & Robin.

"Believer" peaked at number four on the US Billboard Hot 100, becoming the band's third top ten single after "Radioactive" and "Demons". It also reached the top ten in Austria, Canada, Czech Republic, France, Italy, Poland, Portugal, and Switzerland. The song received a notable boost in popularity after it was used in the season finale for the first season of the CW's Riverdale. The song was played heavily in advertisements, notably for the Nintendo Switch Super Bowl LI advertisement, and several movie and television trailers.  It became the fifth best-selling song of 2017 in the United States and one of the best-selling singles of all time. As of November 2022, the song has amassed more than 2.2 billion streams on Spotify. On January 8, 2019, another version of the song was released, featuring American rapper, Lil Wayne. A Halloween mix was released on October 31, 2022, a promo of the song appearing in the October 27, 2022 episode of The Late Show with Stephen Colbert.

Background
In March 2017, Dan Reynolds told People that the song was inspired by his experiences with ankylosing spondylitis in 2015. He said that, "The meaning of the song is really reflecting on specific things in my life that were painful, whether it was anxiety and dealing with crowds, feeling overwhelmed by that or the success of the band, disease, going through depression—anything that was a source of pain in my life. And just rising above that, finding a place of perspective where I could be appreciative of the pain in my life and make it my greatest strength."

Composition
According to sheet music published at Sheetmusicdirect.com, "Believer" is an allegro tempo of 125 beats per minute. Written in the time signature of 12/8, the song is in the key of B♭ minor. Dan Reynolds' vocal range spans from A3 to D5 during the song.

Music video
The official music video for the song was released on March 7, 2017, on the Imagine Dragons Vevo account, and was directed by Matt Eastin. It features a boxing match between Reynolds and Dolph Lundgren, with some scenes showing what seems to be a young Dan drawing on his notepad in scenes. Dan is losing, and he says that he wants to stop, but Dolph replies "We can't." It ends with Reynolds barely conscious, while Young Dan is revealed to have sketched a symbol identical to the one on Reynolds' chest, the "Evolve" symbol. As of 2022, the video has over 2 billion views and over 20 million likes. It is currently the most-viewed and most-liked video on the band's YouTube channel. It is also the 27th most-liked video on the platform.

Commercial performance
"Believer" reached number four on the Billboard Hot 100, and topped the Billboard Hot Rock Songs (29 weeks), Alternative Songs (13 weeks), and Adult Pop Songs (6 weeks). Among component charts, it also topped Rock Airplay, Rock Streaming Songs, Rock Digital Sale Songs, and Top TV Commercials Charts. It also topped the Canada Alternative Rock Chart. "Believer" broke the 14-year-old record for the most spins on the Mediabase Alternative chart. "Believer" has reached the top ten in Austria, Canada, Czech Republic, France, Hungary, Italy, Poland, Portugal, Slovakia, Switzerland, and the United States.

"Believer" was the number one song on several Billboard year-end charts, including the Hot Rock Songs chart, the Rock Airplay chart, and the Alternative Songs chart. The song was the fifth best-selling song of 2017 in the United States, selling 1,598,000 copies in the year.

Live performances
The first televised performance of "Believer" was during the March 22, 2017 episode of ABC late-night talk show Jimmy Kimmel Live!. They then performed the song at BBC Radio 1's Big Weekend. "Believer" was performed again during the 2019 College Football Playoff National Championship halftime show.

Grammy Award-winning singer Michelle Williams performed the song on the second US series of The Masked Singer.

Track listing

Charts

Weekly charts

Year-end charts

Decade-end charts

Certifications and sales

Notable usage in media
 The instrumental version of Believer used in the American film The 15:17 to Paris by Clint Eastwood.
 The song was used in a Nintendo Switch commercial shown during Super Bowl LI.
 The song appeared in the trailer for the 2017 film Murder on the Orient Express where its usage was met with mixed response.
The song appeared on the CW series Riverdale.
The song appeared on the Netflix series Lucifer in the opening scene of Season 05 Episode 11, "Resting Devil Face".
The song is in the dance rhythm game Just Dance 2022.
The song appears in a 2021 advert for the Samsung Galaxy Z Fold 3 and Z Flip 3.
In 2022, the song appeared in commercials for 2K Sports' WWE brand video game, WWE 2K22.
 In 2022, the song’s Halloween remix is promoted during a skit on The Late Show with Stephen Colbert.
This song appears in a rhythm game Rock Band 4.

See also
Believer (2018 American film)
 List of highest-certified singles in Australia

Notes

References

External links
 

2016 songs
2017 singles
American pop rock songs
Imagine Dragons songs
Songs written by Ben McKee
Songs written by Daniel Platzman
Songs written by Dan Reynolds (musician)
Songs written by Justin Tranter
Songs written by Mattias Larsson
Songs written by Robin Fredriksson
Songs written by Wayne Sermon
Song recordings produced by Mattman & Robin
Kidinakorner singles
Interscope Records singles